|}

The Summit Juvenile Hurdle is a Listed National Hunt hurdle race in Great Britain which is open to horses aged three years. It is run at Doncaster over a distance of about 2 miles and half a furlong (2 miles and 128 yards or 3,336 metres), and during its running there are eight hurdles to be jumped. The race is for novice hurdlers, and it is scheduled to take place each year in December.

Prior to 2010 it was run at Lingfield Park on the same day as the December Novices' Chase and the two races are now run on the same day at Doncaster. The race carried Grade 2 status until the 2021 running. It was downgraded to a Listed race by the British Horseracing Authority in 2022.

Records
Leading jockey (2 wins):
 Thierry Doumen – Hors La Loi III (1998), Grand Seigneur (1999)
 Dougie Costello – Royal Bonsai (2011), Kashmir Peak (2012) 
 Daryl Jacob – Peace And Co (2014), We Have A Dream (2017)

Leading trainer (3 wins):
 Reg Akehurst – None So Brave (1991), Dare to Dream (1992), Admiral's Well (1993) 
 Nicky Henderson - Serenus (1996), Peace And Co (2014), We Have A Dream (2017) 
 Paul Nicholls -  Cliffs of Dover (2016), Quel Destin (2018), Monmiral (2020)

Winners since 1987

See also
 Horse racing in Great Britain
 List of British National Hunt races

References

 Racing Post:

 pedigreequery.com – Summit Junior Hurdle – Lingfield.
 rte.ie – "Lingfield abandoned due to frost" (2005).
 breakingnews.ie – "Lingfield abandoned" (2006).
 rte.ie – "Cheltenham and Lingfield abandoned" (2008).
 breakingnews.ie – "Lingfield cancels hurdle meet" (2009).

National Hunt races in Great Britain
Doncaster Racecourse
Lingfield Park Racecourse
National Hunt hurdle races